Chakiyani  چاڪياڻي is the most historical and educated having 100% literacy rate. It is Union Council of the Talka/ Teshil Shahdadkot of the District Qamber Shahdadkot Sindh Province. Most of the land of the Union Council Chakyani  belongs to Wadho and Umrani community. Wadho tribe is known for its contributions in the field of Education. Wadho community donates village  plots for development and prosperity of the village, like for Boys High School, Girls school, Hospital, water supply etc. to the government. Chakyani has a population of around 3000 people. It is located around 48 kilometres northwest of Larkana and 18 kilometers south of Talka Sijawal
The Union Council Chakyani is one of the constituencies of the former prime ministers of Pakistan, Shaheed Zulfiqar Ali Bhutto & Muhtarma Shaheed Benazir Bhutto.

Renowned educational and contributor personalities of the village Chakyani toward the 100% literacy rate:

1. Late  Engineer Ahmed Khan Wadho 
2. Late  Dawood Khan Wadho
3. Late  Professor Ibrahim  Wadho
4. Late Ghulam Mushtafa Wadho 
5. Late Muhammad Baksh Wadho

 Village [[Chakyani]] Official

References

Villages in Sindh
Qambar Shahdadkot District